Chlorococcum is a genus of green algae, in the family Chlorococcaceae. The alga may be useful in the flocculation of lipids from wastewater.

Species
, AlgaeBase accepted the following species:
Chlorococcum acidum P.A.Archibald & Bold
Chlorococcum aegyptiacum P.A.Archibald
Chlorococcum aerium (R.M.Brown & Bold) Wanatabe & Lewis
Chlorococcum africanum Reinsch
Chlorococcum amblystomatis (F.D.Lambert ex N.Wille) N.Correia, J.Varela & Leonel Pereira
Chlorococcum aquaticum P.A.Archibald
Chlorococcum botryoides (Kützing) Rabenhorst
Chlorococcum chlorococcoides (Korshikov) Philipose
Chlorococcum choloepodis (J.Kühn) D.E.Wujek & P.Timpano
Chlorococcum citriforme P.A.Archibald & Bold
Chlorococcum costatozygotum Ettl & Gärtner
Chlorococcum diplobionticum Herndon
Chlorococcum echinozygotum R.C.Starr
Chlorococcum elbense P.A.Archibald
Chlorococcum elkhartiense P.A.Archibald & Bold
Chlorococcum ellipsoideum Deason & Bold
Chlorococcum endozoicum Collins
Chlorococcum fissum P.A.Archibald & Bold
Chlorococcum hypnosporum Starr
Chlorococcum infusionum (Schrank) Meneghini
Chlorococcum isabeliense P.A.Archibald & Bold
Chlorococcum lobatum (Korshikov) F.E.Fritsch & R.P.John
Chlorococcum macropyrenoidosum (Deason & Ed.R.Cox) Shin Watanabe & L.A.Lewis
Chlorococcum macrostigmatum R.C.Starr
Chlorococcum microstigmatum P.A.Archibald & Bold
Chlorococcum minimum Ettl & Gärtner
Chlorococcum minutum R.C.Starr
Chlorococcum nivale P.A.Archibald
Chlorococcum novae-angliae P.A.Archibald & Bold
Chlorococcum oleofaciens Trainor & Bold
Chlorococcum olivaceum (Rabenhorst) Rabenhorst
Chlorococcum pamirum P.A.Archibald
Chlorococcum papillatum Demczenko
Chlorococcum pinguideum Arce & Bold
Chlorococcum pleiopyrenigerum (L.Moewus) Ettl & Gärtner
Chlorococcum pseudodictyosphaerium Metting
Chlorococcum pyrenoidosum P.A.Archibald
Chlorococcum rugosum P.A.Archibald & Bold
Chlorococcum salinum Archibald
Chlorococcum schizochlamys (Korshikov) Philipose
Chlorococcum schwarzii Ettl & Gärtner
Chlorococcum sphagni P.A.Dangeard
Chlorococcum submarinum Ålvik
Chlorococcum tatrense P.A.Archibald
Chlorococcum turfosum (Shin Watanabe & L.A.Lewis) Nakada, Shin Watanabe & L.A.Lewis
Chlorococcum vacuolatum R.C.Starr
Chlorococcum vitiosum Printz

References

External links

Scientific references

Scientific databases
 AlgaTerra database
 Index Nominum Genericorum

Chlorococcaceae
Chlorococcaceae genera